Ardisia rufa is a species of plant in the family Primulaceae. It is endemic to Panama.  It is threatened by habitat loss.

References

rufa
Endemic flora of Panama
Endangered flora of North America
Taxonomy articles created by Polbot